Kenneth Lawrence Hunt (July 13, 1934 – June 8, 1997) was an American professional baseball player who appeared in six Major League seasons for the New York Yankees, Los Angeles Angels and Washington Senators (1959–64).

After two trials with the 1959–60 Yankees, Hunt was selected by the new Los Angeles Angels franchise in the 1960 Major League Baseball expansion draft. He was in the Opening Day starting lineup for the first game in the Angels' history, playing center field on April 11, 1961 in a 7-2 road victory over the Baltimore Orioles.

However, surgery to repair an aneurysm near his throwing shoulder ruined his  season, and Hunt never regained his productive stroke.

All told, he appeared in 310 MLB games, and batted .226 with 177 hits.

He was the stepfather of child actor Butch Patrick (Eddie Munster on The Munsters) and appeared in one episode in 1965 titled "Herman the Rookie".

In 1997 the Hunts were planning to return to Fargo for his 14th consecutive appearance at the Roger Maris tournament. On June 8 Hunt decided to watch his old team, now the Anaheim Angels, on television. He was particularly interested in following a fellow North Dakotan, Angels outfielder Darin Erstad. When his wife, Sherry, returned home later that evening, she found Ken dead from a heart attack. He was 62 years old.
Hunt is buried at Holy Cross Cemetery in Fargo, North Dakota several feet away from Roger Maris, briefly his teammate on the 1960 Yankees.

References

External links 

1934 births
1997 deaths
American expatriate baseball players in Canada
American expatriate baseball players in Panama
Baseball players from North Dakota
Boise Yankees players
Burials in North Dakota
Hawaii Islanders players
Joplin Miners players
Los Angeles Angels players
Major League Baseball outfielders
New Orleans Pelicans (baseball) players
New York Yankees players
Olean Yankees players
Quincy Gems players
Richmond Virginians (minor league) players
San Diego Padres (minor league) players
Shreveport Sports players
Sportspeople from Grand Forks, North Dakota
Tacoma Cubs players
Toronto Maple Leafs (International League) players
Washington Senators (1961–1971) players